Lansdowne is a census-designated place in southern Baltimore County, Maryland, United States, located just south of Baltimore city. As of the 2010 census, it had a population of 8,409. At the 2000 census and earlier, the area was delineated as part of the Lansdowne-Baltimore Highlands CDP.

History
In the late 1800s, the Whitaker Iron Company mined for ore in Lansdowne. Abandoned pits from the mining were filled up by underground springs creating small ponds and lakes. Lansdowne was mostly farmland, including the Kessler farm, MacLeod farm and Wades farm.

When the railroad came, Lansdowne became known as a B&O town. Most people worked for the B&O, commuting by train into Baltimore City.  The first station was named Coursey Station. The Coursey Station senior housing center takes its name from this.

The two main roads were Hammonds Ferry Road and Hollins Ferry Road, both of which led to the Patapsco River where there was once a ferry in operation.

Early churches included the Lutheran Church of Our Savior, St. Clements Catholic Church, Lansdowne United Methodist Church, Lansdowne Christian Church and the First Baptist Church. The Hull Memorial Christian Church was listed on the National Register of Historic Places in 1977. The site of the original wooden school house was on the property that is now St. Clements.

In the 1950s housing developments sprang up in the Riverview area, and new schools were built for these neighborhoods. The Lansdowne Elementary School, Lansdowne Middle School and Lansdowne Senior High were known as the "Golden Education Triangle."

In the early 1960s the B&O closed the railroad crossing and Lansdowne Boulevard was constructed, connecting Lansdowne to Washington Boulevard, bridging over the railroad tracks. A tunnel was also constructed under the tracks for pedestrian crossing.  However, the railroad crossing effectively divided the community into two separate parts. Some old railroad cars were erected as a museum and shopping area alongside Hammonds Ferry Road and the railroad tracks.

In the 1980s Baltimore County Recreation and Parks opened a large parcel of land for public use. Southwest Area Park is located on the Patapsco River, just below Baltimore Highlands.

A small library was built by Baltimore County in 1966, on Third Avenue. In 1993, the Lansdowne Library was closed due to budget cutbacks. The building is now used as the Police Athletic League Center. In 1989 the Lansdowne/Baltimore Highlands Senior Center was built directly behind the Library building. The library reopened on April 8, 2006 with much support from the Lansdowne Improvement Association.

The Lansdowne Improvement Association has been instrumental in much community support, pride and beautification.  With a grant from Baltimore Community Foundation they were able to have a gateway sign installed welcoming visitors to the community of Lansdowne as well as Baltimore Highlands and Riverview.

On November 5, 2007, Lansdowne Station opened, which is a business and retail center located on Washington Boulevard.  It features a Walmart Supercenter, Petco, Office Depot, small retail shops, sandwich and pizza restaurants as well as an office complex.

Geography
Lansdowne is located at  (39.2431, −76.6585).  It is bounded to the northeast by the border of Baltimore City, to the northwest by the former Baltimore and Ohio Railroad (now CSX Transportation), separating the area from Arbutus to the west, to the south by the Patapsco River, which forms the boundary with Anne Arundel County, and to the east by the Baltimore–Washington Parkway, separating Lansdowne from Baltimore Highlands to the east.

Roads

Lansdowne Road
Lansdowne Road is a main road which travels through Lansdowne into South Baltimore (city). The road starts at Hollins Ferry Road and travels west past Lansdowne High School to Hammonds Ferry Road, then to Washington Boulevard.

Hollins Ferry Road
The road starts at Halethorpe Farms Road in the Halethorpe area and proceeds east across I-695, then crosses the Baltimore (city) line after passing Lansdowne Road/Daisy Avenue to Patapsco Avenue, ending at US-1/Washington Boulevard.

Hammonds Ferry Road
Hammonds Ferry Road starts at Andover Road in Linthicum Heights in Anne Arundel County, then travels north, crossing the county line into Lansdowne and passing under the Baltimore Beltway and the Harbor Tunnel Thruway. It then hits Hollins Ferry Road and continues until it reaches Caton Avenue/Patapsco Avenue.

Demographics

As of the census of 2010, there were 8,409 people, 3,057 households, and 2,132 families residing in the CDP. The racial makeup of the CDP was 67.0% White, 23.9% African American, 0.2% Native American, 2.1% Asian, 0.0% Pacific Islander, 3.7 some other race, and 3.0% from two or more races. Hispanic or Latino of any race were 7.7% of the population.

There were 3,057 households, out of which 35.0% had children under the age of 18 living with them, 34.1% were headed by married couples living together, 28.3% had a female householder with no husband present, and 30.3% were non-families. 23.6% of all households were made up of individuals, and 10.1% had someone living alone who was 65 years of age or older. The average household size was 2.75, and the average family size was 3.21.

In the CDP, the population was spread out, with 28.6% under the age of 18, 10.9% from 18 to 24, 27.7% from 25 to 44, 21.9% from 45 to 64, and 11.0% who were 65 years of age or older. The median age was 30.8 years. For every 100 females, there were 87.3 males. For every 100 females age 18 and over, there were 82.4 males.

References

Census-designated places in Baltimore County, Maryland
Census-designated places in Maryland